Ursúa, Ursua, Urzúa or Urzua is a Basque surname. Notable people with the surname include:

Antonio María de Bucareli y Ursúa (1717–1779), Spanish military officer, governor of Cuba, viceroy of New Spain
Domingo Vega Urzúa, also known as Americo, Chilean musician
María José Urzúa, Chilean actress
Martín de Ursúa y Arizmendi, count of Lizárraga (1653–1715), Spanish conquistador during the final conquest of the Maya in 1697
Pedro de Ursúa (1526–1561), Spanish conquistador in the 16th century
Pedro Verdugo de Albornoz Ursúa (1657–1720), Spanish noble and academician

Basque-language surnames